Inventions for Electric Guitar is the first solo studio album by electronic artist Manuel Göttsching. However, it was released with the subtitle Ash Ra Tempel VI, technically making it the sixth and final album under the Ash Ra Tempel name. The album was written and performed entirely by Göttsching on electric guitar.

Some copies of this album indicate that it was encoded with the Stereo Quadraphonic, or "SQ" matrix system, for 4 channel quadraphonic sound. SQ recordings are compatible with standard 2 channel stereo playback systems.

Track listing
All songs composed by Manuel Göttsching.

Personnel
Manuel Göttsching: Guitars

References

1975 albums
Instrumental albums
Ash Ra Tempel albums